Erwin Otto Marx (1893–1980) was a German electrical engineer who invented the Marx generator, a device for producing high voltage electrical pulses.

He worked as an engineering scientist in Braunschweig from 1918 to 1950 where he performed research and development for electrical power distribution via long distances.

Prizes

The Erwin Marx Award is awarded for contributions by individual engineers to pulsed power technology. It was awarded for the first time in 1981 at the 3rd IEEE International Pulsed Power Conference.

The VDE local chapter Braunschweig awards an annual "Erwin-Marx-Prize" to successful graduates from the Braunschweig University of Technology and/or the Ostfalia Hochschule für angewandte Wissenschaften.

References

1893 births
1980 deaths
20th-century German inventors
German electrical engineers
Academic staff of the Technical University of Braunschweig
People from Riesa
Engineers from Saxony